The Escape is a 1972 Hong Kong film.

Cast and roles
 Chia Ling
 Peter Yang Kwan
 Wang Tai Lang
 Ma Cheung
 Cho Kin
 Sun Jung Chi
 Cheung Kwong Chiu
 Cheung Wan Man
 Lee Hung
 Au Lap Bo
 Tai Leung
 Chan Yau San
 Ko Fei
 Lee Kwai

Awards
The film was awarded the 1973 Golden Horse Award for best picture.

References

1972 films
1972 action films
1970s Mandarin-language films
Hong Kong action films
1970s Hong Kong films